Ainur may refer to:
 Ainur, a given name in several languages, such as Arabic, Kazakh and Albanian. The Turkish version of it is Aynur. It means "moonlight"
AINUR (Atlas of Images of Nuclear Rings), catalogue of star-forming ring-shaped regions that circle certain galactic nuclei
Ainu (Middle-earth) (plural: Ainur), spirits in J. R. R. Tolkien's legendarium
 Ainu people, of Japan and the Russian Far East

See also
Ainu (disambiguation)